was a  after Eiryaku and before Chōkan. This period spanned the years from September 1161 through March 1163.

Change of era
 January 28, 1161 : The new era name was created to mark an event or a number of events. The previous era ended and a new one commenced in Eiryaku 2, on the 4th day of the 9th month of 1161.

Events of the Ōhō era
 1161 (Ōhō 1, 2nd month): The emperor visited Kasuga Shrine and other shrines which were situated just outside the boundaries of the capital city.
 July 31, 1162 (Ōhō 2, 18th day of the 6th month): Fujiwara no Tadazane died.

Notes

References
 Brown, Delmer M. and Ichirō Ishida, eds. (1979).  Gukanshō: The Future and the Past. Berkeley: University of California Press. ;  OCLC 251325323
 Nussbaum, Louis-Frédéric and Käthe Roth. (2005).  Japan encyclopedia. Cambridge: Harvard University Press. ;  OCLC 58053128
 Titsingh, Isaac. (1834). Nihon Odai Ichiran; ou,  Annales des empereurs du Japon.  Paris: Royal Asiatic Society, Oriental Translation Fund of Great Britain and Ireland. OCLC 5850691
 Varley, H. Paul. (1980). A Chronicle of Gods and Sovereigns: Jinnō Shōtōki of Kitabatake Chikafusa. New York: Columbia University Press. ;  OCLC 6042764

External links 
 National Diet Library, "The Japanese Calendar" -- historical overview plus illustrative images from library's collection

Japanese eras
1160s in Japan